Parliamentary elections were held in Greece on 16 January 1861. Supporters of the Athanasios Miaoulis-led coalition won a majority of the 138 seats. Miaoulis remained Prime Minister.

References

Greece
1861
1861 in Greece
January 1861 events
1860s in Greek politics